Alteromonas tagae is a marine bacterium.

References

External links
 
Type strain of Alteromonas tagae at BacDive -  the Bacterial Diversity Metadatabase

Alteromonadales
Bacteria described in 2007